DWTE-TV, Channel 2, is a commercial television station owned and operated by TV5 Network Inc. through its licensee ABC Development Corporation. Its studio and transmitter are located at Talingaan St., Brgy. 31, Laoag City.

History
1972 - DWTE-TV channel 2 was launched by Kanlaon Broadcasting System during the Martial Law period, and in 1975, KBS was formally re-launch as RPN, the acronym for its franchise name, Radio Philippines Network.
January 25, 1997 - Associated Broadcasting Company opened its TV station ABC Channel 2 Laoag as a relay (satellite-selling) station of ABC-5 Manila, with the inaugurated its studio and transmitter complex in Talingaan Street, Barangay 31, Laoag City.
August 8, 2008 - The station aired a countdown to its re-launch for much of the next day until 19:00 PHT, when the network officially re-launched under its new name of TV5.
February 17, 2018 - as the recent changes within the network and in celebration of its 10th anniversary, TV5 Laoag was relaunched as The 5 Network with a new logo and station ID entitled Get It on 5 whereas the TV on the northeastern quadrant of the logo has been dropped, making it more flexible for the other divisions to use it as part of their own identity.
January 13, 2019 - 5 Laoag introduced a variation of the current numerical 5 logo, similar to the newly network, 5 Plus.
August 15, 2020 - 5 Laoag was reverted to TV5 while retaining the 2019 numerical 5 logo.

Areas of coverage

Primary areas 
 Ilocos Norte
 Laoag
 Ilocos Sur

Secondary areas 
 Abra

See also
 TV5
 List of television and radio stations owned by TV5 Network

TV5 (Philippine TV network) stations
Television stations in Laoag
Television stations in Ilocos Norte
Television channels and stations established in 1972